Smekhra is a rural locality (a village) in Malyginskoye Rural Settlement, Kovrovsky District, Vladimir Oblast, Russia. The population was 5 as of 2010.

Geography 
Smekhra is located on the Smekhra Lake, 27 km northeast of Kovrov (the district's administrative centre) by road. Ilyino is the nearest rural locality.

References 

Rural localities in Kovrovsky District